Redout is a science fiction racing video game developed and published by Italian studio 34BigThings, and co-published by Nicalis and 505 Games. It is inspired by racing games such as F-Zero, Wipeout, Rollcage, and POD as stated on the game page on Steam.

The game was released for Microsoft Windows in September 2016, while the PlayStation 4 and Xbox One released in August 2017. The Nintendo Switch port was originally slated for a Q2 2017 release, but got delayed and was released in May 2019. The game was released for Amazon Luna on October 20, 2020.

Gameplay

Redout is an anti-gravity racing game set in 2560 where players compete in the Solar Redout Racing League (SRRL) by piloting one of a selection of crafts on several different tracks.

There are seven racing teams and every team has four ships. Each ship has its distinct characteristics of acceleration, top speed, grip, structural integrity, energy pool and energy recharge speed. The players can customize their ship's characteristics installing upgrades and choosing a passive and active powerup of the six of each available.

There are five racing complexes (and an additional seven have been added via DLC) each one consisting of five tracks. Track design includes loops, jumps, teleports, underwater sections, tubular sections and tracks with low or no gravity.

The game features different racing modes of which the most unusual one is the boss mode, a race on a very long track obtained by linking via teleports the five tracks of a racing complex. Multiplayer is supported online via lobbies of up to twelve players and locally via two players split-screen.

The ship controls are similar to that of aircraft, including strafing and pitching the vehicle; the latter is used when turning uphill to prevent the ship from grinding the floor (slowing and damaging the craft) and when turning downhill to prevent redouts (an aesthetic effect).

Sequel
A sequel published by Saber Interactive titled Redout 2 was released for Microsoft Windows, Nintendo Switch, PlayStation 4, PlayStation 5, Xbox One, and Xbox Series X/S on June 16, 2022.

References

505 Games games
2016 video games
Nintendo Switch games
PlayStation 4 games
Video games set in the 26th century
Science fiction racing games
Video games developed in Italy
Windows games
Xbox One games
Unreal Engine games
Multiplayer and single-player video games
Nicalis games